Arabshamshevia is a genus of flies in the family Dolichopodidae from the United Arab Emirates and Israel. It is very close to the genus Shamshevia, differing mainly in the absence of acrostichal setae on the mesonotum. Because of this similarity, it has been suggested that Arabshamshevia may be regarded as a possible synonym of Shamshevia.

The genus name is derived from 'Arab', from Arabian Peninsula, and Shamshevia.

Species
Arabshamshevia ajbanensis Naglis, 2014
Arabshamshevia negevensis Grichanov, 2016

References

Dolichopodidae genera
Diaphorinae
Diptera of Asia